No. 29 Squadron of the Royal Air Force was first raised as a unit of the Royal Flying Corps in 1915, and is one of the world's oldest fighter squadrons. The second British squadron to receive the Eurofighter Typhoon, it is currently the Operational Conversion Unit (OCU) for the Typhoon.

History

First World War
This unit was first raised as a reserve squadron, initially equipped with the Royal Aircraft Factory B.E.2c, in November 1915. In early 1916 however No. 29 became the fourth squadron to receive the Airco DH.2 "pusher" fighter, and arrived in France on 25 March 1916 – helping to end the Fokker Scourge and establish Allied air superiority in time for the Battle of the Somme.

By late 1916 the DH.2 was outclassed by new German fighters, but No. 29 kept its pushers until March 1917, when it was re-equipped with Nieuport 17s. These were replaced with later Nieuport types, such as the Nieuport 24bis, as these became available. Due to a shortage of the Royal Aircraft Factory S.E.5a the squadron retained its Nieuports until April 1918. At this time the squadron finally received the S.E.5a, which it retained for the rest of the war.

The award of a Victoria Cross – the highest award for valour "in the face of the enemy" in the British Empire – to Captain James McCudden of 29 Squadron was gazetted on 2 April 1918, for McCudden's "conspicuous bravery, exceptional perseverance and a high devotion to duty", between August 1917 and March 1918.

October 1918 was a bitter month for the squadron; an American volunteer, Lieutenant Joseph Patrick Murphy was the first to fall on 8 October and become a prisoner of war. British Ace Claude Melnot Wilson was next to fall, on 14 October and Guy Wareing was shot down on the 27 October.

After a short period with the army of occupation in Germany, the Squadron returned to the UK in August 1919 and was disbanded on 31 December 1919. The squadron ended the war having claimed 385 victories. Apart from those already mentioned, the 26 aces who served with the squadron included:

Edgar O. Amm
Norman Brearley 
Sydney Brown
Edgar G. Davies
Francis James Davies
Thomas Sinclair Harrison
D'Arcy Fowlis Hilton
Ernest Charles Hoy
Arthur G. Jones-Williams
Camille Lagesse
William Molesworth
James Dennis Payne
Arthur Reed
Charles G. Ross
Reginald H. Rusby
Alfred Shepherd
Christoffel Venter
Walter Bertram Wood

Inter-war years

The squadron was reformed on 1 April 1923, initially equipped with Sopwith Snipes. These were replaced by Gloster Grebes in January 1925,  In turn, these were replaced by the Armstrong Whitworth Siskin IIIA in March 1928 and Bristol Bulldogs in June 1932. In March 1935, nearly twenty years after it was first raised as a single-seat fighter squadron,  the squadron received two-seater Hawker Demons, which it operated until 1938. This included service in Egypt from October 1935 to 1936, during the Abyssinian crisis. As part of the Royal Air Force’s modernisation and expansion in the late 1930s, No. 29 received Bristol Blenheim IF heavy fighters in December 1938.

Second World War

No 29 began the Second World War with its Blenheims, which at the period operated as day fighters – especially on convoy protection patrols. From June 1940 it became a night fighter squadron, receiving some of the first Beaufighters in November, though it was February 1941 before the squadron was fully equipped with the new fighter. Various marks of the de Havilland Mosquito were flown by the squadron from May 1943 culminating in the Mosquito NF30.

Post-war
During the immediate post-war years the squadron remained a night/all weather fighter unit. The Mosquitoes continued to serve until replaced by Gloster Meteor NF11s in August 1951. In November 1957 the squadron moved to RAF Acklington in Northumberland where it was re-equipped with Gloster Javelins. In July 1958 to RAF Leuchars in Scotland. In February 1963 No 29 moved to Cyprus and in December 1965 went to Ndola in Zambia for nine months on detachment during the Rhodesian crisis. A single aircraft was written off when all undercarriage legs failed to come down on 2 June 1966.

From May 1967 the squadron operated the English Electric Lightning F.3 based at RAF Wattisham near Stowmarket in Suffolk until December 1974 when they re-equipped with the McDonnell F-4 Phantom and moved to RAF Coningsby in Lincolnshire. In May 1982, a detachment of 3 Phantom FGR2’s were deployed at Wideawake airstrip on Ascension Island during the Falklands War. On completion of repairs to the runway at Stanley in August 1982, the squadron deployed 9 aircraft south to the islands, the first arriving on 17 October 1982 flown by the then officer commanding Wing Commander Ian Macfadyen.

In 1987, 29 Squadron was one of the first RAF units to receive the Tornado F3, deploying to Saudi Arabia after the Iraqi invasion of Kuwait in August 1990 and participating in Operation Desert Storm. No. 29 flew the Tornado until disbanding in 1998, as part of the Strategic Defence Review. The squadron was reformed in 2003, this time as the Typhoon operational conversion unit (OCU).

Badge
The badge of the squadron shows an eagle in flight preying on a buzzard, symbolising air combat. The motto in Latin is Impiger et acer - 'Energetic and keen'.

Squadron markings and the "misspelled Roman numeral" tradition
Since the late 1920s, the squadron marking has been three (red) Xs (XXX). Since this closely resembles the Roman numeral for "29" (XXIX) there is a belief among current squadron personnel that this originated as a "misspelling" of the Roman numeral. Although various versions of the tradition are put forward, the most common explanation is that a mis-understood instruction to ground crew to paint "2 X's in front of the roundel and IX behind it" meaning "X,X,(roundel), and 'IX' or 'one-X'" resulted in "XX(roundel)'one times' X". In fact, the marking was always applied as "XXX(roundel)XXX" or as "XXX(roundel)" on smaller types, such as Siskins. Another version is that the original adoption of "XXX" for the 1930s squadron marking was nothing to do with Roman numerals, but was a reference to the brewers' mark for "extra strong", frequently applied to kegs of beer, and that it is only a coincidence that this resembles the numeral for "29" (XXIX).

However, as the original squadron markings on the Gloster Grebe consisted of FOUR Xs, it is likely both versions above are apocryphal, and the four Xs were just a suitable geometric shape that were shortened to three to fit the smaller space on the Armstrong Whitworth Siskin.

Summary of aircraft operated

Royal Aircraft Factory B.E.2c 1915–1916
Airco DH.2 1916–1917
Nieuport 17/24bis 1917–1918
Royal Aircraft Factory S.E.5a 1918–1919
Sopwith Snipe 1923–1925
Gloster Grebe 1925–1928
Armstrong Whitworth Siskin III a 1928–1932
Bristol Bulldog 1932–1935
Hawker Demon 1935–1938
Bristol Blenheim 1939–1940
Bristol Beaufighter 1940–1943
De Havilland Mosquito 1943–1951
Gloster Meteor NF11 1951–1958
Gloster Javelin FAW.9 1957–1967
English Electric Lightning F3 1967–1974
McDonnell Douglas Phantom FGR2 1974–1987
Panavia Tornado F3 1987–1998
Eurofighter Typhoon F2 2003–present
Eurofighter Typhoon FGR 4 2007-present

See also
List of Royal Air Force aircraft squadrons

References

Notes

Bibliography

 
 Franks, Norman; Bailey, Frank; Duiven, Rick. The Jasta War Chronology: A Complete Listing of Claims and Losses, August 1916 - November 1918. Grub Street, London., 1998. .
 Halley, James J. Famous Fighter Squadrons of the RAF: Volume 1. Windsor, Berkshire, UK: Hylton Lacey Publishers Ltd., 1971. .
 Halley, James J. The Squadrons of the Royal Air Force & Commonwealth 1918–1988. Tonbridge, Kent, UK: Air Britain (Historians) Ltd., 1988. .
 Jefford, C.G. RAF Squadrons, a Comprehensive record of the Movement and Equipment of all RAF Squadrons and their Antecedents since 1912. Shropshire, UK: Airlife Publishing, 1988 (second edition 2001). .
 Jones, H. A. The War in the Air: Being the Story of the Part Played in the Great War by the Royal Air Force: Volume II. History of the Great War. Oxford: Clarendon Press, 1928.
 Rawlings, John. Fighter Squadrons of the RAF and their Aircraft. London: Macdonald and Jane's Publishers Ltd., 1969 (second edition 1976). .
 Robertson, Bruce. Aircraft Camouflage and Markings, 1907–1954. Letchworth, Harleyford Publications, 1957.
 Shores, Christopher; Franks, Norman & Guest, Russell. Above The Trenches: A Complete Record of the Fighter Aces and Units of the British Empire Air Forces 1915–1920. London: Grub Street, 1990. .

External links

 RAF Squadron page
 Official Eurofighter site

Education in Lincolnshire
Military units and formations established in 1915
029 Squadron
029
1915 establishments in the United Kingdom